Hamidreza Babaei (born April 22, 1975) is an Iranian footballer. He currently plays for Esteghlal Ahvaz F.C. in the IPL.

Career
Babaei has been with Esteghlal Ahvaz F.C. since 2006.

Club Career Statistics
Last Update  12 May 2010

References

1975 births
Living people
Esteghlal F.C. players
Esteghlal Ahvaz players
Pegah Gilan players
Iranian footballers
Asian Games gold medalists for Iran
Asian Games medalists in football
Footballers at the 1998 Asian Games
Association football goalkeepers
Medalists at the 1998 Asian Games